Located in South Bangalore, Kumaraswamy Layout is a sub locality in Banashankari.

History
Kumaraswamy Layout was formed in the late 1970s by the BDA. This area under BBMP is recently seeing development. This is one of the rapidly growing areas in Bangalore. This makes it one of the most conservative places to live in Bangalore. It has a substantial population of long-term, mostly Kannada-speaking residents.

General information
Kumaraswamy Layout is divided into 2 stages, with the 1st stage being the largest.
Geological Survey of India is located in this area.
Kumaraswamy layout is also an educational hub surrounded by many colleges and institutions. The prominent ones being Dayananda Sagar Institutions, Delhi Public school South, Alpine School.
The area has many parks. All are maintained by the BDA. However, until recently the parks were not as well developed as other parks in the city. The park near 15E bus stand (Shri Atal Bihari Vajpayee Park) is like a mini forest because of its length and extensive tree cover.
Atma Darshan Yogashram, the southern branch of the Bihar School of Yoga is located in Kumaraswamy Layout (Opp Dayananda Sagar College).
Dayananda Sagar College of Engineering which was established in 1979 is located here.
The area is home to eminent Kannada writers like Sri Jayanta Kaykini, Sri A.N.Prahlada Rao and Sri B.S.Keshava Rao. The late Vyasaraya Ballal, another famous Kannada writer, also lived here.
All major shopping areas like Banashankari 2nd stage BDA Complex, Kathriguppe, Jayanagar 4th block and Gandhi Bazaar are very close by.
Multiple temples such as Sri Kumaraswamy temple, Ayyappa Swamy temple, Ganesha temple, 108 Ganesha temple, Shavige Malleshwara temple, Vasantha Vallabharaya Swamy temple (Vasanthapura), Shirdi Sai Baba temple (Vasanthapura) and Sri Lakshmi Sametha Venkateshwara Swamy temple (Devarekere).
Famous hospital group SAGAR Hospitals and Vasavi Hospital also have opened their branch in Kumaraswamy layout which adds up little more weightage to the area.
Mr. L. Sreenivas belonging to BJP was the immediate past corporator of Kumaraswamy Layout BBMP ward No.181.
Many of the banks have their branches in the area. Notable ones being SBI, ICICI Bank, Axis Bank, Canara Bank (ISRO layout and Kumaraswamy layout - post merger of Syndicate bank with Canara Bank), Karur Vysya Bank (ISRO layout), IndusInd Bank and HDFC Bank (50 feet road).
Popular eateries in the area are Dwarka Grand, Cake bites, Tasty Bites, Ivy, Desi Daawat, Sri Krishna Aramane, Stop n Joy, Litti Chokha da Dhaba, Domino's Pizza and Just Shawarma. There is  bakery named Yadava's Bakery. The famous Kaggi's bakery (originally from Hanumanthanagara) has a branch on the 14th main road.

Areas under Kumaraswamy layout
ISRO Layout aka Vikram Sarabhai Layout  – It is an  planned residential area formed by BDA in the mid-1980s for ISRO employees. The area is now managed by Space Employees Cooperative Housing Society. This area is also known as Vikram Sarabhai Layout (ವಿಕ್ರಮ ನಗರ), after the Indian space scientist, Vikram Sarabhai. The BDA's development of ISRO layout acted as a catalyst and had a cascading effect and led to the forming of other areas around the layout. Banashankari 5th Stage, 1st Block also subsumes in ISRO Layout.
Vasanthapura – It is a legendary village, just 12 km away from the City. The village is located on a small hillock with an ancient, quaint temple dedicated to Vasantha Vallabharayaswamy. It is over 600 years old. An idol of goddess Vasanthanayaki, the consort of Vallabharaya swami, can also be seen. Legend has it that sage Mandavya once disappeared from his ashram situated on the banks of the Ganges. His disciples were highly perturbed at the absence of their guru. They made a frantic search over the dales and hills. Finally, they located the rishi meditating in a cave in Vasanthapura. Another temple, situated by the side of Vallabharaya swami temple, is dedicated to Lord Bhavanishankara. This temple was constructed over 400 years ago by Samarth Ramadas, guru of well known Maratha ruler, Shivaji.
Subramanyapura- It is a popular suburb near Kumaraswamy Layout which is adjacent to Vasanthapura. This area is famous for a freshwater lake called 'Dore kere' which is a popular destination for joggers in mornings and evenings.
Vitthal Nagara – Newly formed residential area towards the west of Kumaraswamy Layout and ISRO Layout.
Ilyas Nagar – A Muslim majority area, this area houses the famous Jamia Masjid and the Army Salvation Church.
Yalachenahalli  – A very fast developing area in Bangalore.
Bikasipura – Industrial Area. Houses Khoday's Breweries and Metro.
Vasantha Vallabha Nagar – Fast developing area. City Engineering College, Shri Shreedhara Swamy Ashram, ISKCON Krishna Leela Theme Park, and upcoming Mantri Arena Mall are in this area.
Kanaka Nagar
Minhaj Nagar 
JHBCS (Jarganahalli Housing Board Cooperative Society) Layout (Kanaka Gruha)
Teacher's Colony – An upper middle class sublocality. Divided into 2 stages, 1st stage is in Kumaraswamy Layout and 2nd stage is in Banashankari 2nd stage.
Eshwara Nagar –  One of ISRO's offices is located here.
Bendre Nagar 
Gowdanapalya –  – Also, a very fast developing area in Bangalore.
Naidu Layout
Devarakere Extension – Part of ISRO Layout, located near Devarakere. Also known as Kalyani Nagar. Well known for the famous 'Kere Srinivasa' Temple. Also houses "Sri Krishna Bhavana"
Kailash Nagar, Siddanna Layout, Prasanti Nagar, Chandra Nagar (ಚಂದ್ರ ನಗರ) – Known for the 'Om Shakthi Temple',Nanjappa Layout, Krishna Devaraya Nagar, Harsha Layout, Kashi Nagar , Nanjappa Layout, Sharada Nagar,
Vallabhai Layout
Prathibha Industrial Estate
Anuradha Industrial Estate
Jayachamarajendra Industrial Estate
Sri Maruthi Nagara
Umarbagh Layout
Rajyotsavanagar 
Lingegowda Colony 
Govinayakanahalli

Transport
The area is easily accessible by Bangalore Metropolitan Transport Corporation (BMTC) buses. Kumaraswamy Layout 2nd Stage is a sub Locality in Jayanagar Locality in Bangalore.
Kumaraswamy Layout 2nd Stage is 8.46 km from Kempegowda Bus Station ( Majestic Station ) 
15C (from 1st Stage via South end circle, RV Road), 15E (1st Stage), 15F (2nd Stage), 15G (2nd stage), 210A (ISRO Layout), 210AA (ISRO Layout), 210R (Vasanthapura), 210U (KS Layout West), 210UB (KS Layout West), 210X (Chandra Nagara) connects Kumaraswamy Layout to KR market and Kempegowda Bus Station/Majestic
13A, 13C, 210G, 210GA connects Kumaraswamy Layout to Banashankari, Jayanagar, Shanthinagar and Shivajinagar
412 (Hennur Cross), 500W (ITPL) connects Kumaraswamy Layout to Banashankari, Central Silk Board and beyond
Chakra 3/3A connects Kumaraswamy Layout to Banashankari and Rajarajeshwari Nagar (the frequency seems to have reduced)
411 connects Kumaraswamy Layout to Madiwala, Koramangala and Dommaluru (the frequency seems to have reduced)
600G connects Kumaraswamy Layout to Central Silk Board, Jayadeva, Electronics City and Chandapura
MBS-9 (210A-276) connects Kumaraswamy Layout to Malleshwaram, BEL Circle and Vidyaranyapura (the frequency seems to have reduced)
402G connects Kumaraswamy Layout to Mekhri Circle, CBI, Hebbal, Kodigehalli Gate and Yelahanka Satellite Town 5th Phase. (the frequency seems to have reduced)

Route numbers 202 (to Yeshwanthpura), 340C (to Parangipalya), 202E (to Mathikere), 374H (to Vijayanagara), 271M (to Jalahalli 7th camp) were discontinued due to poor response from the public.

All three metro stations on the Namma Metro Green line (Silk Institute to Nagasandra) – Banashankari, Jayaprakash Nagara and Yelachenahalli are very close to the area.

References

External links
Kumaraswamy Layout in Metrolife

Neighbourhoods in Bangalore